Ambesa lallatalis is a species of snout moth in the genus Ambesa. It was described by George Duryea Hulst in 1886. It is found in North America, including California and Utah.

References

Moths described in 1886
Phycitinae
Moths of North America